Institute of Political Studies in Belgrade is an academic institution in Belgrade, Serbia. It is for research of political science.

History
The institute was started in 1968. It developed out of the research unit of the High School of Political Science. It developed into an independent scientific institution. After separating from the Faculty of Political Science in Belgrade, the Institute for Political Studies was given the status of independent scientific institution.

Journals
The current periodical editions of the Institute are: 
Serbian Political Thought 
Political Review
National Interest

References

External links

Research institutes in Serbia
Organizations based in Belgrade
Research institutes established in 1968
1968 establishments in Serbia
Vračar